Japan–Montenegro relations refers to the bilateral relationship between Japan and Montenegro. Japan recognised Montenegro on 16 June 2006, stating then that "the policy of the Government of Japan [is] to attach importance to the peace and stability of Western Balkans countries including Montenegro".

History
During the Russo-Japanese War, volunteers from Montenegro were encouraged to fight in the Russian Army in Manchuria. However, Montenegro was not mentioned in the 1905 peace treaty and a technical state of war was presumed to exist between the two countries. In 2006, Japan made the gesture of recognising Montenegrin independence following its secession from Serbia and declared then that hostilities were over.<ref> "Montenegro, Japan to declare truce," United Press International (US). 16 June 2006; "Montenegro, Japan End 100 Years' War," History News Network (US). citing World Peace Herald, 16 June 2006; retrieved 2011-05-11</ref>

Recent developments
Montenegro has an honorary consulate in Tokyo, but there is no resident Japanese representative in Montenegro. However, the country has been recipient of Japanese development aid, and in 2017 the Japanese ambassador to Serbia visited the Montenegrin Prime Minister.

Montenegro has minor trade relations with Japan. In 2017 it imported goods worth €19 million from there and exported €2 million worth. According to the Japanese Foreign Ministry, there was a very small community of 27 Japanese nationals in Montenegro in 2017.

In 2016, Montenegro expelled 58 foreigners (of whom only four were Japanese) linked to the doomsday cult Aum Shinrikyo, which was behind the deadly nerve gas assault on the Tokyo subway in March 1995. A police statement said they had “received information from [Japanese] partner security services showing that a group of foreign nationals, who were numbers of a closed religious group, were staying in Montenegro.”

 See also 

 Foreign Relations of Japan
 Foreign Relations of Montenegro
 Japan–Yugoslavia relations

 Notes 

References 
 Batrićević, Đuro. (1996). Crnogorci u rusko-japanskom ratu (Montenegrins in the Russo-Japanese War). Cetinje: Obod.  OCLC 040389738
 __. (1994). Dr Anto Gvozdenović: general u tri vojske. Crnogorci u rusko-japanskom ratu (Dr. Anto Gvozdenovic: General in Three Armies; Montegegrans in the Russo-Japanese War'') Cetinje: Obod. ;  OCLC 164797877

External links 
 Japanese Ministry of Foreign Affairs (MOFA), Japan-Montenegro Relations
 Tighter bonds with the Japanese

 
Montenegro
Bilateral relations of Montenegro